Kootaberra is a locality in the Far North region of South Australia. The boundaries were formalised on 26 April 2013, but the name had been used long before that for the Kootaberra Station pastoral run (sheep station).

References

Towns in South Australia